Konya station is an inter-city railway station serving the central anatolian city of Konya. It serves as the southern terminus of the Polatlı–Konya high-speed railway with YHT high-speed trains from Ankara and Istanbul servicing the station. Inter-city trains to Izmir and Adana also terminate at the station. In 2011, the station was expanded, modernized and electrified to accommodate the new YHT high-speed rail service.

The train station will have an operational Konya Metro station in 2023.

Pictures

References

External links
İstanbul Konya Hızlı Tren

Railway stations in Konya Province
Railway stations opened in 1896
1896 establishments in the Ottoman Empire
Buildings and structures in Konya
High-speed railway stations in Turkey